Commercial Swimming Club is a swimming club that is based at the Fortitude Valley Pool in centre of Brisbane, Queensland. It is one of the most successful clubs in Australia and has produced many Olympic swimmers and medalists. Commercial swimmers have represented Australia at 9 Olympic Games, 8 World Championships, and 7 Olympic Games. Famous swimmers include Susie O’Neill, Cate and Bronte Campbell, Kieren Perkins, and Libby Trickett.

Notable athletes 

James William Thompson World Record One Mile Backstroke, 1918
Angela Russell
Carolyn Reid
Tracey Wickham
Michael Bohl
Kieren Perkins
Angus Waddell
Leisel Jones (2004–2007)
Susie O'Neill
Samantha Riley
Jessicah Schipper (2008– )
Melanie Schlanger
Libby Trickett (left in 2008)
Tarnee White
Christian Sprenger (2013–2015 )
Cate Campbell (2013–2016 )
Bronte Campbell (2013–2016 )
Jayden Hadler (2014–2016 )
Tommaso D'Orsogna (2014–2016 )

The Commercial Swimming Club is over 110 years old, commencing as a ladies' club, "The Ladies Commercial Amateur Swimming Club" about November, 1903.  A men's club, "The Commercial Amateur Swimming Club" commenced in 1913 and the two clubs amalgamated in 1974.

A history of the club, "A Century of the Natatorial Art, the Commercial Swimming Club 1903 - 2003" was written by Barry T Short, being published in Brisbane in 2004 by Media IQ Pty Limited of Southport, funded by the club, Media IQ and the Brisbane City Council, and is available from the club.

All of the original records and other photographs and documentation relating to the club's first 104 years in the possession of the Club, were handed to the John Oxley Library, part of the Queensland State Library, in Brisbane by Barry Short, in 2007, to prevent the loss of any of these records as did happen to much of the early records.  Additional records relating to each season of the club are being forwarded to the John Oxley Library to continue the recording of the club's history, for the benefit of those writing a history of the club's second 100 years.

The beginning of the club in 1903 and after, shows a very different story to the modern swimming scene.  The ladies club conducted a 3-mile race in the Bremer River, on 22 March 1913, won by Miss Minnie King.  Apparently, in this time period, the QASA regularly conducted 3 mile races in the river for men. Jim Dunning, the men's club's original Secretary tells us that "On the Saturday before the three mile swim, the Queensland Ladies Amateur Swimming Association allowed men to be spectators at a ladies carnival for the first time in many years. It was the occasion of the interstate ladies Championship." Another ladies 3 mile race was conducted by Commercial ladies in the following season in 1913.  The men's club's first world record holder, James William Thompson,  attained it  swimming one mile backstroke.  He is recorded of being a world record holder early in the men's club's life (from 1913,) and a copy of a Certificate shows he swam a further mile world record on 18 January 1918, swimming the distance in backstroke in 29 minutes, 4 1/5 seconds, at the City Baths, Wickham St., Valley, Brisbane.  At that time the baths were covered and were 100 feet long, and were also called the Booroodabin Baths.

See also

List of swim clubs

References

External links
 official website

1903 establishments in Australia
Sports clubs established in 1903
Australian swim teams
Organisations based in Queensland
Sporting clubs in Brisbane
Swimming clubs
Fortitude Valley, Queensland